Yesenia Saskia Ferrera Nuñez (born October 16, 1998) is a Cuban artistic gymnast. She rose to prominence as a first-year senior in 2014 but soon encountered an injury that sidelined her for two seasons until she returned in 2017.

Career

2014 

In August, Ferrera competed at the Pan American Championships in Mississauga, Ontario, Canada. She finished fourth in the all-around but claimed silver in the vault final and bronze in the floor final.

Later, in November, she traveled to Veracruz for the Central American and Caribbean Games. She clinched the vault and floor titles, also grabbing a bronze on balance beam.

2017 

Ferrera returned to elite competition in June 2017 at the Central American Sports Festival in Guatemala City, Guatemala. She won the all-around competition, as well as the vault and floor titles too.

References 

1998 births
Living people
Cuban female artistic gymnasts
Sportspeople from Santiago de Cuba
Gymnasts at the 2019 Pan American Games
Central American and Caribbean Games gold medalists for Cuba
Central American and Caribbean Games silver medalists for Cuba
Central American and Caribbean Games bronze medalists for Cuba
Competitors at the 2014 Central American and Caribbean Games
Pan American Games medalists in gymnastics
Pan American Games silver medalists for Cuba
Central American and Caribbean Games medalists in gymnastics
Medalists at the 2019 Pan American Games
21st-century Cuban women